The Kentucky Cup Juvenile Fillies Stakes is an American Thoroughbred horse race run annually at Turfway Park in Florence, Kentucky. A Listed race run near the end of September, it is open to two-year-old fillies and is contested on Polytrack synthetic dirt at a distance of one mile (eight furlongs).

The counterpart to the Kentucky Cup Juvenile Stakes, both races were discontinued in 2009 due to financial restraints. The event offered a purse of $100,000 in 2008.

With the support of WinStar Farm, this race which was suspended in 2009 and 2010 due to economic challenges, will return in 2011.

Records
Speed record
 1:36.60 - Love That Jazz (1996)

Most wins by a jockey
 2 - Gary Stevens (1995, 1998)
 2 - Mike E. Smith (1996, 2002)
 2 - Edgar Prado (1999, 2003)

Most wins by a trainer
 2 - D. Wayne Lukas (1994, 1995)
 2 - Robert E. Holthus (2001, 2005)
 2 - Bob Baffert (2002, 2003)
 2 - Steve Asmussen (2004, 2007)

Most wins by an owner
 2 - William Heiligbrodt (1999, 2004)

Winners

References

External links
 The 2008 Kentucky Cup Juvenile Fillies Stakes at Bloodhorse.com
 Kentucky Cup Stakes restored by WinStar Farm

Listed stakes races in the United States
Flat horse races for two-year-old fillies
Recurring sporting events established in 1994
Turfway Park horse races
1994 establishments in Kentucky